Seed of Destruction may refer to:

 "Seed of Destruction" (Space: 1999), the 13th episode of the second series of Space: 1999
 Hellboy: Seed of Destruction, the first Hellboy story arc
 EverQuest: Seeds of Destruction, an expansion to the MMORPG Everquest